Pointman is a TV movie pilot and TV series on the Prime Time Entertainment Network in 1994 to 1995. The premise of the main character is he is framed and convicted of fraud while he was an investment banker. Eventually cleared, Constantine 'Connie' Harper helps others while running a coastal resort. The hotel, pool and marina scenes in the Pilot episode were filmed at the South Shore Harbour Resort & Conference Center and adjacent South Shore Harbour Marina in League City, Texas.  The series was filmed in Jacksonville, Florida.

TV movie
In this TV movie, the main character, Constantine Nicholas 'Connie' Harper (Jack Scalia), is framed and sent to prison for fraud and assaulting the trial's prosecuting attorney. After serving his time and granted his release, a former cellmate requests that Connie protect the cellmate's sister, Rosie (Roxann Dawson), an aspiring clothing designer, who is being threatened by a diamond broker as Harper was put on "the list", a collection of people to go to for last resort assistance.  At first Connie is reluctant to help, but he eventually agrees to protect Rosie from the diamond broker.

TV series

Pointman was greenlighted for a series and ran for two seasons of 13 then 9 episodes. In the series, Constantine "Connie" Harper, the main character, sets up shop as an owner of a Florida beach resort (Jacksonville, Florida and its beach suburbs), Spanish Pete's, while aiding people in need with the use of "the list" and former jailmates.

Cast
Jack Scalia as Constantine 'Connie' Harper

Episodes

Season 1 (1995)

Season 2 (1995)

References

External links and sources
 
 

First-run syndicated television programs in the United States
Television series by Warner Bros. Television Studios
Prime Time Entertainment Network
1995 American television series debuts
1995 American television series endings
Television shows set in Florida
Films directed by Robert Ellis Miller